Brouch is a small town in the commune of Boevange-sur-Attert, in western Luxembourg.  , the town has a population of 740 and 280 households.

References

Mersch (canton)
Towns in Luxembourg